Merchant Taylors' School may refer to:

Merchant Taylors' School, Northwood (founded 1561), is a British independent school originally located in the City of London and now located in Northwood in Middlesex .
Merchant Taylors' Boys' School, Crosby (founded 1620), a British independent school for boys, located in Great Crosby on Merseyside
Merchant Taylors' Girls' School (founded 1888), a British independent school for girls, also located in Great Crosby on Merseyside

See also
Worshipful Company of Merchant Taylors

Worshipful Company of Merchant Taylors